Aganonerion is a plant genus in the family Apocynaceae, first described in 1905. It contains only one known species, Aganonerion polymorphum, native to Indochina (Thailand, Laos, Cambodia, Vietnam).

Aganonerion polymorphum is used medicinally and as a food, appearing for example in a traditional Vietnamese soup called canh chua. In Vietnamese, the plant is called lá giang, literally "river leaf." In Cambodia, it is called /vɔə tʰnɜŋ/ (វល្លិថ្នឹង) or /kaɔt prɷm/ (កោតព្រំ).

This plant is a perennial herb with glabrous climbing stems of 1.6–4.0 m long. Its leaves are ovate glabrous with short petioles, and are 2.5–10 cm long and 2–5 cm wide. The tips of the leaves are sharpened while the base is cordate. Its flowers are umbel, with follicles that are 8–15 cm long and 5–8 mm wide.

References

External links

Flora of Indo-China
Monotypic Apocynaceae genera
Vietnamese cuisine
Apocyneae